Karen Macarena Roco Aceituno (born 7 October 1986) is a Chilean canoeist. She is commonly known in her country to compete alongside María José Mailliard, with whom she has been interviewed or referenced multiple times.

Early life
Between 1996 and 1997, Roco began to do canoe when she was 10 in her hometown Constitución, where she attended the Eduardo Martín Abejón School, whose then director was the President of the Chilean Canoeing Federation. According Roco, she was «very restless and they ―the teachers―» used to send her to the inspector's office.

With the goal to improve her skills, the director decided to send her to a sports workshop dedicated to canoeing when still she didn't know how to swim. Thus, all her «classmates wanted to go», reason why she had a stimolous to got into canoeing.

Sports career
On 29 July 2019, Roco algonside María José Mailliard obtained a silver medal in the 2019 Pan American Games.

On 18 January 2021, Roco was honored in her hometown Constitución by the mayor of the city and Cecilia Pérez, then minister of Sport of the second government of Sebastián Piñera (2018−2022).

She competed with Mailliard in the 2020 Summer Olympics. There, they finished in the ninth place.

Political career
On 6 August 2021, it was reported that Roco will run for regional councilor of the Maule Region in quota for Evópoli, centre-rightist party.

References

1986 births
Living people
Chilean female canoeists
Santo Tomás University alumni
Olympic canoeists of Chile
Canoeists at the 2020 Summer Olympics
Pan American Games medalists in canoeing
Medalists at the 2019 Pan American Games
Pan American Games silver medalists for Chile
21st-century Chilean women